William Fairbairn and Sons, was an engineering works in Manchester, England.

History
William Fairbairn opened an iron foundry in 1816 and was joined the following year by a Mr. Lillie, and the firm became known as Fairbairn and Lillie Engine Makers, producing iron steamboats.

Their foundry and millwrighting factory burned down on 6 August 1831 with damage estimated at £8,000. The business survived this event.

Shipbuilding
In 1830, they built the iron paddle-steamer Lord Dundas, for use on the Forth and Clyde Canal. She proved so successful that the firm built eight more of a larger size within the next two or three years for Scottish canals, two passenger-boats with 40 horsepower engines for the Humber and two for the lakes of Zurich and Walenstadt in Switzerland, which, after being tried, were sent out dismantled.

In 1831, they built the Manchester, in 1832, La Reine des Beiges, with engines of 24 horsepower, which went from Liverpool to Ostend. Minerva was sent in pieces to Hull where she was assembled. She then made the voyage to Rotterdam in 33 hours, and steamed up to the Rhine Falls, where she was again dismantled and carried overland to Lake Zurich.

The difficulties which were found to exist in an inland town like Manchester for the construction of iron vessels led to this branch of the business moving to London in the years 1834-5. There at Millwall on the Isle of dogs, William Fairbairn constructed more than eighty vessels of various sizes, including the Pottinger, of 1250 tons and 450 horsepower, for the Peninsular and Oriental Steam Navigation Company, the Megaera and other vessels for the Royal Navy, and many others. Thus introducing iron shipbuilding on the River Thames. Until in 1848 when Fairbairn retired from this branch of his business.

Railway locomotives
When Mr. Lillie left the firm in 1839, the name changed to William Fairbairn & Sons and the company's attention turned to railway  locomotives.

Their first designs were of the four-wheeled "Bury" type, built for the Manchester and Leeds Railway. Generally they built to the design of the customer or similar to those being produced by Edward Bury and Company and Sharp, Roberts and Company.

In all they produced over sixty-nine locomotives for the M&LR, their main customer, but they also built for the "little" North Western Railway and for lines in Ireland. Their production was mainly lightweight 0-4-0, then 2-2-2, 2-4-0 and 0-4-2 engines typical of the day. One example of a Fairbairn locomotive, a small 2-2-2 tank engine, is preserved, in Rio de Janeiro.

In 1852, Fairbain delivered four locomotives to Estrada de Ferro Mauá, Brazil's first railway company, the four of them said to be 2-2-2T. The locomotive first used during the railway line construction works was one called Manchester, but the one to pull Mauá Railway's - and therefore Brazil's - inauguration train 30 April 1854 was the one called Baroneza (modern spelling is "Baronesa"). In 1890, due to the proclamation of the Republic, DPII was renamed into CB and Baroneza continued #1 until her withdrawal before World War I. She was preserved by CB and after 1957 by RFFSA's railway preservation agency PRESERFE. Today under the responsibility of IPHAN, as mentioned above she's exhibited at former RFFSA's Engenho de Dentro railway museum in Rio de Janeiro, RJ.

However, in 1851-5 they built 40 larger engines to the design of James McConnell for the Southern Division of the London and North Western Railway. In 1862 they built some 2-2-2 locomotives to the design of the Great Eastern Railway.

The Midland Railway and the West Midland Railway bought a number of 0-6-0 and in 1861, the Furness Railway bought two 0-4-0s. The locomotive building part of the business was sold to Sharp Stewart and Company in 1863.

Work 
William Fairbairn was an innovative engineer and his company was involved in many developments across the whole field of engineering. When the Albert Hall was built as a memorial to Prince Albert the company was involved in the design. Although the hall itself was built of brick and terracotta the dome (designed by Rowland Mason Ordish) on top was made of wrought iron and glazed. There was a trial assembly made of the iron framework of the dome at William Fairbairn's Manchester works, then it was taken apart again and transported to London via horse and cart. When the time came for the supporting structure to be removed from the dome after reassembly in situ, only volunteers remained on site in case the structure dropped. It did drop – but only by five-sixteenths of an inch.

 An Account of the Construction of the Britannia and Conway Tubular Bridges, (1849)
 Experiments to determine the effect of impact, vibratory action, and long continued changes of load on wrought iron girders, (1864) Philosophical Transactions of the Royal Society of London vol. 154, S. 311
 Treatise on Iron Shipbuilding, (1865)

See also
McConnel & Kennedy Mills
Kay & Routledge

References 

 Lowe, J.W., (1989) British Steam Locomotive Builders, Guild Publishing
 Pole, W., (1877) The Life of Sir William Fairbairn, Bart., (ed. W. Pole)

External links 
 History William Fairbairn & Sons 

Fairbairn
Manufacturing companies based in Manchester
Defunct companies based in Manchester